Zhongyuanxilu  is a subdistrict in Zhongyuan District,  Zhengzhou in the province of Henan, China.

See also
List of township-level divisions of Henan

References

Township-level divisions of Henan